Do Ya is the sixth studio album by the Australian hard rock band The Screaming Jets. It was released by StockXChange Music and distributed by Sony BMG. The album was recorded and produced in Australia and the United States and released on 13 October 2008.

it was the first studio album by the band since 2000's Scam.

Band member Dave Gleeson said;  "We have not given up hope yet, we want to proudly fly the flag of pub rock. Many of today’s kids are stuck in the iPod generation, where you don’t listen to albums anymore … you hand-pick one song and then skip to another. We want to bring back the feel of listening to an album. We have issues we feel need touching on, look at climate change, even its title had to be watered down due to political correctness, as people are too afraid to call it global warming. Look at our fat-cat politicians – they decided to round up all our homeless during the Olympics, so visitors couldn’t see the plight of our homeless. There are so many other issues out there that need to be touched on, but kids of today, prefer to listen to a Katy Perry song about kissing a girl, go figure."

On lead single "Do Ya", Izzy Osmanovic says; ""Do Ya" was written one night on my way to rehearsals. I had this tune in my head and by the time I got to the rehearsal room I said to the guys: 'hey I’ve got this riff and melody in my head, I haven't played it on guitar yet but give me five minutes and ill work it out.' And that was that, we created a monster. The story to the song is about a mate of mine who got married to only be told not long after that his Mrs doesn't love him anymore.".

Track listing

Release history

References

The Screaming Jets albums
2008 albums
Sony Music Australia albums